Chowgan (also Romanized as Chowgān; also known as Chauga, Chaugen, and Chowgān-e Fa‘leh Korī) is a village in Bavaleh Rural District, in the Central District of Sonqor County, Kermanshah Province, Iran. At the 2006 census, its population was 338, in 72 families.

References 

Populated places in Sonqor County